Crauthem is a town in the commune of Roeser, in southern Luxembourg.  , the town has a population of 1,228.

Roeser
Towns in Luxembourg